The 2009–10 Pittsburgh Panthers women's basketball team will represent the University of Pittsburgh in the 2009–10 NCAA Division I women's basketball season. The Panthers will be coached by Agnus Berenato. The Panthers are a member of the Big East Conference and play their home games at the Petersen Events Center in Pittsburgh, Pennsylvania.

Previous season
The 2008-09 Pitt women's basketball went 25–8, a program record number of wins, en route to Pitt's second consecutive NCAA Sweet 16 appearance and a final #15 national ranking in both the AP and Coaches' polls. Point guard junior Jania Sims was injured during the first game of the season and redshirted. Pitt graduated all-time leading scorer Shavonte Zellous who was a first round draft pick by the WNBA's Detroit Shock.  Pitt also graduated second team all-Big East guard Xenia Stewart.

Offseason

May 19: Pitt head coach Agnus Berenato was awarded an honorary degree of Doctor of Humane Letters by Seton Hill University. Berenato was recognized for her efforts in building the Panthers program into a national success. Her honorary diploma was presented to her by Seton Hill President JoAnne W. Boyle, Ph.D., it stated “Family, colleagues, students and friends describe you as ‘genuine,’ ‘a master motivator,’ ‘a live ball of action,’ ‘a real go-getter,’ ‘loyal,’ and finally ‘amazing.’”
May 22: Shavonte Zellous' jersey was announced that it would be inducted into the Women's Basketball Hall of Fame's "Ring of Honor".
July 16, 2009: Pitt sophomore center Shawnice "Pepper" Wilson was named a finalist for the USA Basketball U19 World Championship Team. Wilson participated in trials at the United States Olympic Training Center in Colorado Springs, Colorado, as the group was cut from 27 participants to the 14 finalists, but withdrew due to injury.
August: Head coach Agnus Berenato is selected for and participates in a tour of overseas U.S military bases with the goal is to boost "the morale and quality of life for deployed military personnel by providing entertainment from the home front."
The Pitt women's basketball team is selected to play on national or regional television seven times for the 2009–10 season, including three games on the ESPN family of networks.
 Two freshman recruits joined the team: 5'9" guard Ashlee Anderson from Chicago, IL and 6'5" center Leeza Burdgess from Miami, FL.

Roster

Schedule
Pitt's 2009-10 schedule.

|-
!colspan=9| Exhibition

|-
!colspan=9| Regular Season

|-
!colspan=9| Postseason†Big East Women's Basketball Championship

|-
!colspan=9| Women's National Invitation Tournament

Rankings

Player stats

See also
Pittsburgh Panthers women's basketball
Pittsburgh Panthers men's basketball
2009–10 Pittsburgh Panthers men's basketball team
Pittsburgh Panthers
University of Pittsburgh
Big East Conference

References

External links
 Official Site 

Pittsburgh Panthers women's basketball seasons
Pittsburgh